Futa (born 2003) is a male red panda (Ailurus fulgens) in the zoo of Chiba, Japan. In 2005, he became a visitor attraction and a television celebrity in Japan for his ability to stand upright on his hind feet for about ten seconds at a time.

At the time, this feat drew about 6,000 visitors to the zoo each weekend and resulted in Futa's appearance in a soft drink television advertisement. Futa was still at it in 2020, aged 15, equivalent to a human age of 70.

Futa inspired the character of Pabu, an animal companion in the animated U.S. TV series The Legend of Korra.

References

Individual mammals
Chiba (city)
2003 animal births
Ailuridae